Tokelo Moyakhe (born 3 August 1993), is a South African rapper and songwriter known professionally as Maglera Doe Boy (or simply Maglera). He came to prominence subsequent to the release of "Never Ride" by MashBeatz after the single went viral on a video sharing platform TikTok.

In 2015 he made a name for himself after releasing his debut EP Progression which was later named Hype Magazine's top 5 underrated EPs and mixtapes.

Moyakhe signed a distribution deal with Universal Music South Africa through Khuli Chana's imprint Mythrone Records which he later released his debut studio album Diaspora under, and as he was named the fast rising artist from South Africa he was featured on the Apple Music Up Next playlist.

Discography

Studio albums 
 Diaspora (2022)

Collaborative albums 
 Champion Music (2020)
 Champion Music 2 (2022)

Extended plays 
 Progression (2015)

Awards and nominations

References

External links 
 

1993 births
Living people
South African record producers
South African musicians
People from Gauteng
South African rappers
Sotho people
21st-century rappers
21st-century South African musicians